Academia Quintana F.C. are an Association Football club from San Juan, Puerto Rico. They were founded in 1969, making them one of the oldest clubs still in existence in Puerto Rico. They are one of the founding members of the Puerto Rico Soccer League, the island's first nationwide league. The reserve team plays in the Liga Nacional. The club plays their home games at the Hiram Bithorn Stadium, sharing the facility with Atléticos de San Juan. The team currently plays in the Liga Puerto Rico.

History
The team was founded in 1969, playing in a baseball field. The team was named after a public housing project, also known as Residencial César Cordero, since it served to develop several players that lived there. The team has won 15 national titles during its four decades of existence making it the most successful club in Puerto Rico.

2008 season
Before the beginning of the season the team participated in exhibition games against college teams. Academia Quintana played their debut game on 5 July 2008 against Tornados de Humacao, which they won 5–0. In their second game (against Atléticos de San Juan) the team lost by three goals to two. Academia Quintana then lost its second straight game (against Sevilla FC) on 20 July 2008. Quintana defeated Guaynabo Fluminense FC in their fourth game. On the fifth date of the tournament the team tied with Gigantes de Carolina, with both teams scoring a single goal. On 10 August 2008, Quintana defeated Caguas Huracán. This marked the end of the league's first half, the teams would then compete against each other a second time. In the first two games of this stage, Academia Quintana lost to Club Atletico River Plate Puerto Rico and defeated Tornados de Humacao. To close the regular season, the team won 3 and lost 2 games.

2009 season
Opened the 2009 Season with a 2–1 loss to Carolina Giants
. Finishing six in the league table and missing the play off.

2010 season

2011 season

2012 season

2013 season

2014 season

2015 season

2016 season

2017 season
A week before the PRSL season, PRSL officials held a meeting and granted Academia Quintana request to join the Cup of Excellence. It was reported that Quintana fulfilled the economic responsibilities they had with the PRSL and were therefore allowed to enter the Cup, demonstrating that the league administration is working seriously to put order and discipline among its members.

Current squad
Updated as of 29 March 2017.

Notable former players
This list of notable former players comprises players who went on to play professional soccer after playing for the team in the Puerto Rico Soccer League, or those who previously played professionally before joining the team.

  - Hector Ramos    
  - Joseph Marrero (2013)

Club hierarchy

Academia Quintana Ltd.

Chairman: Benjamín Martínez

Academia Quintana plc.

Vice President : Norman Morales

Club treasure  : José Barreda

Club Secretary : Francisco Castellano

Stadium

 They currently play in Hiran Bithorn Stadium, sharing it with Atlético de San Juan.

Achievements

Torneo Nacional Superior: 6
1995/96, 1996/97, 1997/98, 1999/00, 2000/01, 2001/02
Runners-up (1): 1998/99

Liga Mayor de Fútbol Nacional: 1
2005

Campeonato Nacional de Fútbol de Puerto Rico: 0
Runners-up (1): 2006

Liga Metropolitana Futbol de Puerto Rico: 1
2008

References

External links

Association football clubs established in 1969
Football clubs in Puerto Rico
Puerto Rico Soccer League teams
1969 establishments in Puerto Rico